This is a list of minelayer ship classes by country

Australia

HMAS Bungaree −1 ship in service 1941 to 1946

China
Wolei-class minelayer – 1 ship in service from 1988

Denmark
Falster-class minelayer – 4 ships (in Danish) all scrapped
Lindormen-class minelayer – 2 ships (sold to Estonia)

Finland

Finnish minelayer Louhi 1 ship in service 1918 to 1945
Finnish minelayer Keihässalmi 1 ship in service from 1957 to 1994
Hämeenmaa-class minelayer 2 ships in service from 1992
Pansio-class minelayer 3 ships in service from 1991
Finnish minelayer Pohjanmaa 1 ship in service from 1979 to 2013
Pukkio-class minelayer 3 ships in service from 1947 to 1991
Ruotsinsalmi-class minelayer 2 ships in service 1940 to 1975
Teplokhod-class motor minelayer 8 ships 1914 to 1952? ( 3? also used by the Estonian Navy)

France
French cruiser Pluton 1 ship in service 1929 to 1939
Pluton-class minelayer (1912) 2 ships in service 1914 to 1921

Germany

Imperial German Navy
Brummer-class cruiser – 2 ships
Nautilus-class minelayer – 2 ships
SMS Deutschland (1914) – 1 ship
SS Königin Luise (1913) – 1 ship

Kriegsmarine
German training ship Bremse – 1 ship
German training ship Brummer – 1 ship
 Drache – 1 ship (ex Yugoslav)
Brummer (ii) – 1 ship (ex Norwegian)

Iran
Iran Ajr – 1 ship

Italy

Regia Marina
Italian minelayer Fasana – 1 ship
Azio-class minelayer – 6 ships

Japan

Imperial Japanese Navy
Hatsutaka-class minelayer – 3 ships
Japanese minelayer Itsukushima – 1 ship
Japanese minelayer Kamishima – 1 ship
Japanese minelayer Minoo – 1 ship
Natsushima-class minelayer (1933) – 3 ships
Japanese minelayer Okinoshima – 1 ship
Japanese minelayer Shirataka
Sokuten-class auxiliary minelayer (1913) – 13 ships
MV Tenyo Maru (1935) – 1 ship
Japanese minelayer Tsugaru – 1 ship
Japanese minelayer Yaeyama – 1 ship

Korea (ROK)
Nampo-class minelayer

Netherlands
Douwe Aukes-class minelayer – 2 ships
Hydra-class minelayer – 2 ships
Prins van Oranje-class minelayers – 2 ships

Norway
HNoMS Frøya – 1 ship
Vale-class gunboat – 5 ships (4 captured by Germany)
Glommen-class minelayer – 2 ships (1 captured by Germany)
HNoMS Olav Tryggvason – 1 ship (captured by Germany)
 Gor-class Former US Navy Auk-class.
 «Brage» ex. USS «Triumph» (1961–1991)
 «Gor»
 «Uller»
 «Tyr»
 Vidar-class Two ships built in Norway.
  (1977–2006) Sold to Latvia in 2006.
  (1978–2003) Donated to Latvia in 2003.

Poland
ORP Gryf (1936) – 1 ship

Romania
 NMS Aurora – 1 ship
 NMS Alexandru cel Bun – 1 ship
 NMS Amiral Murgescu – 2 ships
 NMS Regele Carol I – 1 ship
 OMm35-class minelayer – 2 ships (ex Czech)

Russia (Soviet Union)

Imperial Russian Navy
Amur-class minelayer (1898)

Soviet Navy
Alesha-class minelayer – 3 ships
Marti −1 ship (former imperial yacht)

Spain
Júpiter-class minelayer – 4 ships

Sweden
HSwMS Älvsborg – 1 ship (sold to Chile)
HSwMS Älvsnabben (M01) – 1 ship
HSwMS Carlskrona (P04) – 1 ship
HSwMS Visborg – 1 ship

Taiwan
Min Jiang-class minelayer – 4 ships

Turkey
Ottoman minelayer Nusret – 1 ship

United Kingdom
HMS Abdiel (1915)
HMS Adventure (M23) 1 ship in service 1922 to 1944 
Abdiel-class minelayer – 6 ships in service 1941 to 1972
Linnet-class minelayer – 3 ships in service 1938 to 1964
HMS Plover (M26) – 1 ship in service 1927 to 1969
HMS Agamemnon (M10)
HMS Abdiel (N21) – 1967 to 1988

Yugoslavia
Silba-class landing ship-minelayer −3 ships (subsequently to Croatia)

Class
Minelayers